The International Imaging Industry Association (I3A) was created by a merger of the Photographic and Imaging Manufacturers Association (PIMA) and the Digital Imaging Group in 2001. It was a trade association serving the photographic industry, which included tracking the market size.

I3A also served as the sponsor for ANSI and ISO standards for photography, including PTP (ISO 15740) as well as consortia standards such as the Internet Imaging Protocol.

It transferred the sponsorship of ANSI and ISO photographic standards to IS&T in January 2011, and disbanded in October 2013.

PIMA and NAPM
The Photographic and Imaging Manufacturers Association, or PIMA, was founded in 1946 under the name National Association of Photographic Manufacturers (NAPM). In 1997 the name was changed to PIMA.  NAPM and PIMA served as the sponsor for ANSI and ISO standards for photography from 1946 until 2001.

References

External links
 (defunct since 2013)
Archive

Photography organizations
Imaging
Videotelephony